FC Samtskhe (Georgian: საფეხბურთო კლუბი სამცხე) is a Georgian association football club based in Akhaltsikhe, which currently competes in Regionuli Liga, the fifth tier of the national league system.

History
Samtskhe was established in 2019 on the basis of Akhaltsikhe Sport School. The next year they joined Regionuli Liga competition as the second team of the city along with Meskheti.

Due to COVID  and relevant restrictions related to it the season consisted of 13 games only. The debutants prevailed in their very first game over Tori Borjomi and overall performed well enough not only to retain their place in the league, but also to finish in the top five, four points short of the promotion slot.

In March 2021 the team eliminated Liga 4 side Sulori Vani from the national Cup.  

In the regular season the start was dodgy with the initial 15 winless games, although the club significantly improved in the autumn.

Seasons

Squad
As of March 2021

(C)

Name
Samtskhe is a synonym of Meskheti and represents the Western part of Samtskhe-Javakheti.

References

External Links
Page in Facebook

Football clubs in Georgia (country)